The 1933–34 season was the third season of competitive association football in the Football League played by Chester, an English club based in Chester, Cheshire.

It was the club's third consecutive season in the Third Division North since the election to the Football League. Alongside competing in the league, the club also participated in the FA Cup and the Welsh Cup.

Over November and December 1933, Chester scored six or more goals in three consecutive fixtures. No other English team did this again until EFL Championship club Fulham in January 2022.

Football League

Results summary

Results by matchday

Matches

FA Cup

Welsh Cup

Season statistics

References

1933-34
English football clubs 1933–34 season